Nihat Genç (born 1956) is a Turkish journalist, writer and thinker.

He graduated from Trabzon Commerce School in 1974 continuing at the Istanbul Academy of Economic and Commercial Sciences and Ankara School of Banking  and in 1983, and higher studies in Health Administration. After graduation, he worked in Ministry of Health, the Ankara Rehabilitation Center, and for many years in civil service at the Ministry of Culture.

In his youth, he worked as a technician in newspapers and magazines and eventually started writing in nationalistic publications like Bağımsız and Kırmızı-Beyaz and the humoristic publication Leman and for a short while in Akşam newspaper. In 1989, he co-founded with Hakan Albayrak the cult Çete magazine. He became well known by his critical thoughts in journal column "Bir Soru - Bir Cevap" (meaning one question, one answer). From 2003 to 2008, he was part of a long television series of interviews as a political commentator in Nihat Genç ile Ne Var Ne Yok? on Sky Türk until 2008. The program was hosted by Serdar Akin. This was followed by another interview series Nihat Genç ile Veryansın on Avrasya TV between 2008 and 2011 hosted by Lale Şıvgın. In 2012, he has appeared in Nihat Genç Ko-nu-şu-yor! on Halk TV and in 2013, in Nihat Genç İle Ver-yansın on Ulusal Kanal. The way he expresses his opinions during the TV programs are at many times angry and very emotional. He also signs articles in odatv.com political website.

After criticizing the organizers of a 2005 conference about Ottoman Armenians During the Decline of the Ottoman Empire at Sabancı University and Boğaziçi University, his long-time publisher cut ties with him stopping all future publications of his books.

Today, Genç is working with Veryansın TV, a platform for the "voice of the patriots". He writes on Veryansın TV website and makes appearances on the youtube channel videos. He is still very spirited and sentimental as always.

Works
 Dün Korkusu (1989)
 Bu Çağın Soylusu (1991)
 Ofli Hoca / Şeriatta Ayıp Yoktur
 Kompile Hikayeler
 Dar Alanda Tufan (1993)
 Soğuk Sabun (1994)
 Köpekleşmenin Tarihi (1998)
 Modern Çağın Canileri (2000)
 Memleket Hikayeleri
 Arkası Karanlık Ağaçlar (2001)
 İhtiyar Kemancı (2002)
 Amerikan Köpekleri (2004)
 Edebiyat Dersleri (2004)
 Nöbetçi Yazılar (2004)
 Hattı Müdaafa (2005)
 Karanlığa Okunan Ezanlar (2006)
 Aşk Coğrafyasında Konuşmalar (2007)
 Kavga Günleri (2007)
 Veryansın (2008)
 Bir Millet Uyanıyor 17: "Kavga Günleri" (2009)
 Sordum Kara Çiçeğe (2009)
 Opus 61 (2010)
 Yurttaşların Cinlerle Bitmeyen Savaşı (2011)
 İşgal Günleri (2011)
 Bizi Kandırası Umman Bulunmaz (2012)
 Direniş Günleri (2013)
 İslamcı Erol Nasıl Çıldırdı? (2015)   
 Yurduma Alçakları Uğratma! (2016)
 Nihat Genç'le Veryansın (2017)
 Bizim De Günümüz Gelecek (2020)
 Saraya Kılınan Namazlar (2021)

References

External links
Official website

Turkish writers
Turkish journalists
1956 births
Living people
People from Trabzon